Gert Munch Larsen (born 9 February 1960 in Hvidovre) is a Danish curler and curling coach.

At the national level, he is a ten-time Danish men's champion curler (1979, 1982, 1987, 1988, 1993, 1994, 1995, 1997, 1998, 2001) and a two-time Danish mixed champion curler (2001, 2002).

He participated at the demonstration event at the 1988 Winter Olympics, where Danish men's team finished sixth. As a coach of Danish women's curling team he participated at the 2014 Winter Olympics, where Danish women's team finished sixth.

Awards
Collie Campbell Memorial Award: 1994.

Teams

Men's

Mixed

Record as a coach of national teams

Private life
He is married to fellow Danish curler Malene Krause. They are the parents of former world junior champion Mikkel Krause, skip of Denmark's team at the 2022 Winter Olympic Games. Larsen was coach of his son's 2009 World Junior Curling Championships winner.

References

External links

Living people
1960 births
People from Hvidovre Municipality
Danish male curlers
Danish curling champions
Curlers at the 1988 Winter Olympics
Olympic curlers of Denmark
Danish curling coaches
Sportspeople from the Capital Region of Denmark
20th-century Danish people